Shangdu, also known as Xanadu, was the summer capital of the Yuan dynasty of China before Kublai decided to move his throne to the former Jin dynasty capital of Zhōngdū which was renamed Khanbaliq (present-day Beijing). Shangdu is located in the present-day Zhenglan Banner, Inner Mongolia. In June 2012, it was made a World Heritage Site for its historical importance and for the unique blending of Mongolian and Chinese culture.

Venetian traveller Marco Polo described Shangdu to Europeans after visiting it in 1275. It was conquered in 1369 by the Ming dynasty army under the Hongwu Emperor. In 1797, historical accounts of the city inspired the famous poem Kubla Khan by the English Romantic poet Samuel Taylor Coleridge.

Descriptions 
The most visible modern-day remnants are the earthen walls though there is also a ground-level, circular brick platform in the centre of the inner enclosure.

The city, originally named Kaiping (Kāipíng, "open and flat"), was designed by Chinese architect Liu Bingzhong from 1252 to 1256, and Liu implemented a "profoundly Chinese scheme for the city's architecture". In 1264 it was renamed Shangdu by Kublai Khan. At its zenith, over 100,000 people lived within its walls. In 1369 Shangdu was occupied by the Ming army, put to the torch and its name reverted to Kaiping. The last reigning Khan Toghun Temür fled the city, which was abandoned for several hundred years.

In 1872, Steven Bushell, affiliated with the British Legation in Beijing, visited the site and reported that remains of temples, blocks of marble, and tiles were still to be found there. By the 1990s, all these artifacts were completely gone, most likely collected by the inhabitants of the nearby town of Dolon Nor to construct their houses. The artwork is still seen in the walls of some Dolon Nor buildings.

Today, only ruins remain, surrounded by a grassy mound that was once the city walls. Since 2002, a restoration effort has been undertaken.

By Marco Polo (1278) 
The Venetian explorer Marco Polo is widely believed to have visited Shangdu in about 1275. In about 1298–99, he dictated the following account:

By Toghon Temur (1368) 
The lament of Toghon Temur Khan (the "Ukhaant Khan" or "Sage Khan"), concerning the loss of Daidu (Beijing) and Heibun Shanduu (Kaiping Xanadu) in 1368, is recorded in many Mongolian historical chronicles. The Altan Tobchi version is translated as follows:

By Samuel Purchas (1625) 
In 1614, the English clergyman Samuel Purchas published Purchas his Pilgrimes – or Relations of the world and the Religions observed in all ages and places discovered, from the Creation unto this Present. This book contained a brief description of Shangdu, based on the early description of Marco Polo:

In 1625 Purchas published an expanded edition of this book, recounting the voyages of famous travellers, called Purchas his Pilgrimes. The eleventh volume of this book included a more detailed description of Shangdu, attributed to Marco Polo and dated 1320:

By Samuel Taylor Coleridge (1797) 
In 1797, according to his own account, the English poet Samuel Taylor Coleridge was reading about Shangdu in Purchas his Pilgrimes, fell asleep, and had an opium-inspired dream. The dream caused him to begin the poem known as 'Kubla Khan'. Unfortunately Coleridge's writing was interrupted by an unnamed "person on business from Porlock", causing him to forget much of the dream, but his images of Shangdu became one of the best-known poems in the English language.

Coleridge described how he wrote the poem in the preface to his collection of poems, Christabel, Kubla Khan, and the Pains of Sleep, published in 1816:

Coleridge's poem opens similarly to Purchas's description before proceeding to a vivid description of the palace's varied pleasures:

Astronomy
In 2006, the International Astronomical Union (IAU) gave a continent-sized area of Saturn's moon Titan the name Xanadu, referring to Coleridge's poem. Xanadu raised considerable interest in scientists after its radar image showed its terrain to be quite similar to earth's terrain with flowing rivers (probably of methane and ethane, not of water as they are on Earth), mountains (of ice, not conventional rock) and sand dunes.

See also 
 List of mythological places
 Karakorum, the earlier Mongol Empire capital founded by Genghis Khan, and built in stone by Ögedei Khan in 1220
 Shangri-La
 Shambhala

References

External links 
 Shangdu Google Satellite Map
 Xanadu - World History Encyclopedia
 Sites of the Yuan Dynasty Upper Capital (Xanadu) and Middle Capital  (UNESCO World Heritage)

Medieval cities
Major National Historical and Cultural Sites in Inner Mongolia
Yuan dynasty
Ancient Chinese capitals
Former populated places in China
World Heritage Sites in China
Kublai Khan